Dr. Babasaheb Ambedkar is a 2000 Indian English-Hindi bilingual feature film directed by Jabbar Patel. It stars Mammootty in the title role. The film tells the story of B. R. Ambedkar, known mainly for his contributions in the emancipation of the downtrodden and oppressed castes, and as a result, the oppressed classes in India and shaping the Constitution of India, as the chairman of the Drafting Committee of the Indian Constituent Assembly.

Dr. Babasaheb Ambedkar won the National Film Awards for Best feature film in English, Best Actor (Mammootty) and Best Art Direction (Nitin Chandrakant Desai) in 1999. The film was screened retrospective on August 15, 2016 at the Independence Day Film Festival jointly presented by the Indian Directorate of Film Festivals and Ministry of Defence, commemorating 70th Indian Independence Day.

Plot
Bhimrao Ambedkar studying in Columbia University library is approached by Lala Lajpat Rai to join his home rule league but Ambedkar refuses to do so as he came here on the scholarship of his highness Sayajirao Gaekwad III of Baroda State. Ambedkar is unable to afford studying in America so he also works part-time jobs washing plates and cleaning.

He passed his M.A. exam in June 1915, majoring in economics, and other subjects of sociology, history, philosophy and anthropology. He presented a thesis, Ancient Indian Commerce. Ambedkar was influenced by John Dewey and his work on democracy. In 1916 he completed his second thesis, National Dividend of India - A Historic and Analytical Study for another M.A. In October 1916, he enrolled for the Bar course at Gray's Inn, and at the same time enrolled at the London School of Economics where he started working on a doctoral thesis. 1917 The term of his scholarship from Baroda ended, so that he was obliged to go back to India in June with his work unfinished; he was, however, given permission to return and finish within four years. He sent his precious and much-loved collection of books back on a steamer—but it was torpedoed and sunk by a German submarine Ambedkar went to Baroda State to work as a probationer in the Accountant General's Office . A scholarship of 11.50 British pounds a month, for three years, was awarded to the young Ambedkar and per the agreement he has to serve baroda for 10 years after the completion of his studies. However, upon arriving in Baroda, he realized that none of the Hindu hotels would allow his to stay due to his lower caste. He found a Parsi inn, but here, non-Parsis were not allowed to stay. He and the Parsi inn-keeper reached a compromise, where by Ambedkar gave his name as a Parsi, and was allowed to stay. After joining the new office as a new senior officer (Probationary officer) being an untouchable the peon of the office doesn't give him file in his hand he throw files on his table, Ambedkar feel thirsty and ask for a glass of water, the peon says there is no water when he goes on to drink water from the pot, Upper caste people finds this very uncomfortable and insult him and he is not allowed to drink water from that pot as they think by his touch it will pollute the water so they tell him to bring his own water and call him dirty and untouchable. After a few days of stay in Baroda it is discovered by other Parsis, that he is not Parsi and on the eleventh day of his stay, a group of angry Parsi men, armed with sticks, arrived to remove him from the inn. He had to leave the inn that very day, and not having a place to stay, was forced to leave Baroda and return to Bombay to find work elsewhere.

In Bombay, Ambedkar applies for the post of professorship as professor of political economy in Sydenham College of Commerce and Economics. On the first day of his job the students makes fun of him thinking what this untouchable will teach them does he know how to speak English. In the staff room when Ambedkar approaches towards water pot to drink water a professor named Trivedi doesn't like it and insults him. Ambedkar is approached by Shri Shahu Maharaj of Kolhapur and Ambedkar starts a newspaper called Mooknayak in the year 1920. Ambedkar took a conference in Mangaon in Kolhapur it was attended by Shri Shahu Maharaj. The Maharaj declared in a prophetic vein "You have found your saviour in Ambedkar and I am confident that he will break your shackles".

Cast
Mammootty as Dr. B. R. Ambedkar
Sonali Kulkarni as Ramabai Ambedkar, first wife of Ambedkar
Priya Bapat as young Ramabai
Mrinal Kulkarni as Savita Ambedkar, second wife of Babasaheb
Govind Namdeo as Subedar Ramji Maloji Sakpal, father of Babasaheb
Mohan Gokhale as Mohandas Karamchand Gandhi
Tirlok Malik as Lala Lajpat Rai
Anjan Srivastav as Sayajirao Gaekwad III
Nawazuddin Siddiqui as one of the leaders of Second Mahad Satyagraha and in background of Manusmriti Dahan
Sushant Singh as Asnodkar, a friend he met while studying in London
Nandu Madhav as Gangadhar Nilkanth Sahasrabuddhe
 Ashok Lokhande as Bhaurao Gaikwad
 Nikhil Ratnaparkhi as Professor Trivedi ( Special Appearance)

Production
The film was a project funded jointly by the Ministry of Social Justice and Empowerment and the Government of Maharashtra. It was made at a budget of  8.95 crore. The production was managed by the government-owned National Film Development Corporation of India. 

In an interview with Pritish Nandy of Rediff.com, director Jabbar Patel said that the research and filming took three years each. The government said they wanted a film on the scale of Richard Attenborough's Gandhi. For the role of Ambedkar, they considered hundreds of actors around the world. Patel claimed that, in that search, they also sought Robert De Niro who was very keen on the role but backed off when he was told that he had to drop his American accent and speak the way Ambedkar did—in his typically "clipped Indo-British accent". Mammootty was cast by chance when Patel saw his picture on a magazine and felt he had some resemblance with Ambedkar. Mammootty was initially resistant to be cast as that would have meant shaving off his mustache, recalls Patel. Since there were no footage of Ambedkar available to them, his body language and way of talking was to be done out of imagination. The film was simultaneously shot in English and Hindi.

Although Dr. Babasaheb Ambedkar was certified in 1998, it was released commercially in 2000.

Music

Awards
The film won  National Film Awards (India) in 1999.
 Best Actor - Mammootty
 Best Art Direction - Nitin Chandrakant Desai

See also
 List of artistic depictions of Mahatma Gandhi

References

External links
 

2000 films
2000 biographical drama films
Films about B. R. Ambedkar
Films featuring a Best Actor National Award-winning performance
Films whose production designer won the Best Production Design National Film Award
Best English Feature Film National Film Award winners
English-language Indian films
Cultural depictions of B. R. Ambedkar
Cultural depictions of Mahatma Gandhi
Cultural depictions of Jawaharlal Nehru
Cultural depictions of Muhammad Ali Jinnah
2000 drama films
Films about Buddhism
Films directed by Jabbar Patel